Melasinae is a subfamily of false click beetles in the family Eucnemidae. There are about 15 genera and at least 30 described species in Melasinae.

Genera

These 15 genera belong to the subfamily Melasinae:

 Adelothyreus Horn, 1890 g b
 Arrhipis Bonvouloir, 1871 g b
 Dirrhagofarsus Fleutiaux, 1935 g b
 Entomophthalmus Bonvouloir, 1871 g b
 Epiphanis Eschscholtz, 1829 i c g b
 Golbachia Cobos, 1955 b
 Hylis Des Gozis, 1886 g b
 Hylochares Latreille, 1834 g b
 Isorhipis Boisduval & Lacordaire, 1835 g b
 Melasis Olivier, 1790 g b
 Microrhagus Dejean, 1833 g b
 Protofarsus Muona, 2000 b
 Rhagomicrus Fleutiaux, 1902 g b
 Sarpedon Bonvouloir, 1871 g b
 Xylophilus Mannerheim, 1823 i c g b

Data sources: i = ITIS, c = Catalogue of Life, g = GBIF, b = Bugguide.net

References

Further reading

External links

 

Eucnemidae
Beetle subfamilies